York Historic District is a national historic district located in the central business district and surrounding residential areas of York in York County, Pennsylvania.  It is north of the Springdale Historic District.   The district includes 309 contributing buildings and includes notable examples of the Late Victorian and Classical Revival styles.  Notable buildings include the Christ Lutheran Church (1812–1814), Odd Fellows Hall (1850), U.S. Post Office (1911), Strand and Capitol Theatre (1923–1925), Elks Home (1860s), Pullman Factory Building (c. 1900), Sylvia Newcombe Center (1892), Friends Meeting House (1766–1783), William C. Goodridge house (1827), Otterbein United Methodist Church (1869), St. John Episcopal Church (1765), Lafayette Club (1839), National Hotel (1828–1863), Bon Ton (1911), Smyser-Bair House (1830s), and Pennsylvania Central Railroad Station (1880s).  Located in the district and separately listed are the Barnett Bobb House and Gen. Horatio Gates House and Golden Plough Tavern.

It was listed on the National Register of Historic Places in 1979, with a boundary increase in 2008.

References

External links

York, Pennsylvania
Historic districts on the National Register of Historic Places in Pennsylvania
Victorian architecture in Pennsylvania
Colonial Revival architecture in Pennsylvania
Historic districts in York County, Pennsylvania
National Register of Historic Places in York County, Pennsylvania